In game theory, a kingmaker scenario in a game of three or more players, is an endgame situation where a player who is unable to win has the capacity to determine which player among others will win. This player is referred to as the kingmaker or spoiler. No longer playing for themselves, they may make game decisions to favor a player who played more favorably (to them) earlier in the game. Except in games where interpersonal politics, by design, play a decisive role, this is undesirable.

Gladiator example

Consider this simple game: Three gladiators play, with strengths 3, 4, 5. In turn, each gladiator must engage another, and they begin combat. The result of combat is that the weaker player is eliminated, and the stronger player loses strength equal to that of the weaker player. (For example, if "5" attacks "3", "3" will die and "5" will have strength 2.) The winning gladiator is the last one standing.

Each round of combat eliminates one gladiator, so there will be two rounds of combat. The first round of combat will eliminate one participant and weaken the other to a strength no greater than 2. The nonparticipant's strength is at least 3, so they are guaranteed to win the second round of combat, and the entire contest. Therefore, the game collapses: The winning gladiator is the one not involved in the first battle.

Hence, the gladiator whose turn comes first is the kingmaker. They must be involved in the first battle, hence cannot win, but with the liberty of choosing their opponent in that battle, can elect either of the other two players to be the winner of the contest.

In practice

Because they allow the outcome of the game to be determined by a player of (presumably) inferior strategy, kingmaker scenarios are usually considered undesirable, though to some extent they may be unavoidable in strategy games. Of course the argument can be made that this means the winner, chosen by the kingmaker, played with the additional restriction of not annoying the other players as much, presumably a more difficult task. In these games, the game mechanics, players' outcomes and strategies are often so interconnected that to eliminate all possibilities of this situation is almost impossible.

In tournament situations where for instance the first few teams proceed to the next round, a player that is already guaranteed to proceed can experience a situation similar to a kingmaker.
They can sometimes influence who of the remaining players comes in second (when 2 players proceed). For such a player it can be profitable to make sure the weakest player proceeds, because this reduces his competition in subsequent rounds.
This is often seen as undesirable because it conflicts with the concept that the strongest few are allowed to proceed to the next round.

Different games deal with the kingmaker problem in different ways:

 In the 2002 board game Puerto Rico, players conceal their victory point totals. This makes it unclear (unless players are especially attentive) which player is in the lead.
 By introducing randomness, games can make sure that everyone in the game still has a chance of winning the game, no matter how bad their situation may be. Obscuring victory points can also accomplish this, for not knowing whether one can still win can have the same effect as still having a chance to win. For example, in the group stages of tournaments such as the FIFA World Cup, the final set of games in the group are often played at the same time. This results in fewer situations where one team has no chance of proceeding.
 Games can have rules that eliminate players who have no chance of winning the game, so they can not influence the game further (poker and Risk are examples of this).
 Games, especially in a tournament setting, can attribute value to places other than the first place. The potential kingmaker would be able to play for their own benefit even if they can no longer win. In the example of the gladiators, if the gladiator with strength 4 has to be involved in the first round, they will choose the gladiator with strength 3 as opponent instead of being indifferent.
 Most games prohibit—with penalties greater than match loss (for example, ostracism, disqualification)—questionable or unsportsmanlike conduct geared toward effecting a kingmaker scenario.
 Stalling, or intentionally slowing game play in timed games, for personal advantage or to that of a currently leading player, is normally treated as unsportsmanlike conduct.
 The use of revokes, or intentional rules violations, in trick-taking card games, to void a round and effect a kingmaker scenario is discouraged by use of severe penalties. In tournaments, doing this can be classified as cheating.
In the later rounds of a Magic: The Gathering tournament, the rules permit a player to concede defeat for any reason other than bribery. Many players follow a practice of conceding to anyone who has a strong chance of winning one of the eight playoff spots, thereby avoiding as far as possible even the appearance of engaging in unsportsmanlike collusion with any party in preference over any other.
In chess, the FIDE handbook recommends drawing lots such that players of the same national chess federation do not meet in the last few rounds. In the Candidates Tournament for example, players of the same national federation are made to play each other in the first round.

Other games may explicitly encourage a kingmaker scenario. An example of this is the television series Survivor, where the last seven to ten contestants voted out form a jury that chooses a winner from the final two contestants.

See also 
 Spoiler effect

References 

Game design